Castel Bolognese is a comune (municipality) in the Province of Ravenna in the Italian region Emilia-Romagna, located about  southeast of Bologna and about  southwest of Ravenna. As of 2006, it has a population of about 9,000 inhabitants.

Castel Bolognese borders the following municipalities: Faenza, Imola, Riolo Terme, Solarolo.

Main sights

The Castle, built from 1389. It was destroyed in 1501 by duke Cesare Borgia, together with the walls. The latter were rebuilt by the Papal forces in 1504. Of the castle, today parts of the walls and a tower survive.
Civic Museum
Biblioteca Libertaria Armando Borghi
Church of San Sebastiano (1506).
Church of San Francesco (18th century), including a statue attributed to Jacopo della Quercia, a 15th-century wooden crucifix and paintings by Giovan Battista Bertucci il Giovane and Ferraù Fenzoni.
Church of San Pietro Apostolo
Church of San Petronio
Church of Santa Maria della Pace

Transport

Rail 
The railway station is called Castel Bolognese–Riolo Terme. It is on the railway line connecting Bologna to Ancona.

Roads 
Castel Bolognese can be reached through the A14 motorway which is the Italian part of the E45 European Route, by taking the exit Imola (coming from the North) or Faenza (coming from the South).

Demographic evolution

Twin towns
 Abtsgmünd, Germany

References

External links
 www.comune.castelbolognese.ra.it/
 All About Castel Bolognese's history

Cities and towns in Emilia-Romagna
Castles in Italy